Carmageddon II: Carpocalypse Now is a vehicular combat video game, the sequel to Carmageddon, and released in 1998 for Microsoft Windows. The game was developed by Stainless Games and published by Sales Curve Interactive in Europe and Interplay Entertainment in North America. Ports for Mac OS, PlayStation and Nintendo 64 (the latter as Carmageddon 64) were released in 1999. A 2D version for the Game Boy Color was released in Europe in 1999, and in North America in 2000.

Gameplay

Like its predecessor, Carmageddon II was subject to criticism for the level of violence portrayed in the game. It is rated 15+ by ELSPA. In some countries, the pedestrians (and animals) are zombies, and blood is turned to green slime, while in Germany, aliens replaced the pedestrians. Internet-released 'blood patches' restore the original human pedestrians. The blood pack was later released in the United Kingdom in 1999, earning the game an 18 certificate.

Carmageddon II was the first Carmageddon game to feature hardware acceleration, this was used for the higher quality damage models and higher quality levels.

Carmageddon II features new damage models for the vehicles, this includes car bodywork damage such as fenders and vehicle spoilers. Cars can also be split in half, instantly wasting them, but only if it is not repaired before it touches terrain.

Unlike the first game, Carmageddon II does not have "stealworthy cars", which are cars that have a chance to be taken if wrecked in a race and instead any car wrecked can be purchased.

Reception

The PC version received "favorable" reviews according to video game review aggregator GameRankings, while the console versions received much lower scores.

Official UK PlayStation Magazine was scathing of the gameplay of the PlayStation version, saying that "no amount of pureed pedestrian can cover its faults." The Nintendo 64 port was ill-received, being N64 Magazines lowest rated game at 8% from 1999 till 2004. Hyper, on the other hand, gave the same port 85%, calling it "a success, and probably more suited to the Nintendo 64 than it ever was on the PC, as this is big arcade-style silly action."

Carmageddon 64 was nominated for the "Worst Game" award at GameSpots Best and Worst of 2000 Awards, which went to Spirit of Speed 1937.

Music
The game features a heavy metal soundtrack.  Four original songs by Iron Maiden are included:
 "The Trooper"
 "Aces High"
 "Be Quick or Be Dead"
 "Man on the Edge"
Music by Sentience is also used.

References

External links

1998 video games
Aqua Pacific games
Blazing Renderer games
Classic Mac OS games
Fiction about death games
Game Boy Color games
Interplay Entertainment games
Mobile games
Nintendo 64 games
PlayStation (console) games
Racing video games
Single-player video games
Vehicular combat games
Video game sequels
Video games developed in the United Kingdom
Video games scored by Allister Brimble
Windows games
Stainless Games games